Sir Roy Emile Jack (12 January 1914 – 24 December 1977) was a New Zealand politician of the National Party. He was a cabinet minister and Speaker of the House of Representatives.

Biography

Early life and career
Jack was born in New Plymouth in 1914. He was educated at Wanganui Collegiate School and graduated from the Victoria University with an LLB. Jack was a Judge's Associate from 1935-1938, before enlisting with the Royal New Zealand Air Force during World War Two. He was first elected onto Wanganui City Council in 1946 and was deputy mayor in the following year. He served on the city council until 1955.

Member of Parliament

George Chapman who chaired the selection said that "the tensions were tremendous, but Roy was finally confirmed as the candidate." He had an election-night majority of 2067 in 1972, down from Shelton's 1969 majority of 4214.

In the 1972 Marshall Ministry of the last year of the Second National Government, he was Attorney-General and Minister of Justice. He was Chairman of Committees between 1961 and 1966. He was Speaker of the House of Representatives from 1967 to 1972 and 1976 to 1977.

Death
He died in 1977 on Christmas Eve in his office at parliament.

Honours 
In the 1970 Queen's Birthday Honours, Jack was appointed a Knight Bachelor, for outstanding services as Speaker of the House of Representatives.

References

 

Who's Who in New Zealand, 10th Edition 1961.

|-

|-

|-

|-

1914 births
1977 deaths
People educated at Whanganui Collegiate School
Victoria University of Wellington alumni
New Zealand National Party MPs
New Zealand Knights Bachelor
Speakers of the New Zealand House of Representatives
Members of the Cabinet of New Zealand
New Zealand MPs for North Island electorates
People from New Plymouth
Royal New Zealand Air Force personnel
Members of the New Zealand House of Representatives
New Zealand military personnel of World War II
20th-century New Zealand politicians
New Zealand politicians awarded knighthoods
Justice ministers of New Zealand